The Welsch Motor Court-Erin Plaza Motor Court was a historic complex of buildings at 311 E. 1st St. in Ogallala, Nebraska.  It was also known as Plaza Inn and was denoted KH04-106 by the Nebraska State Historical Society.  It was demolished sometime in 2012–13, and removed from the National Register.

It was listed on the National Register of Historic Places in 2005; the listing included four contributing buildings and one other contributing structure.

References 

Hotel buildings on the National Register of Historic Places in Nebraska
Buildings and structures in Keith County, Nebraska
Hotels in Nebraska
National Register of Historic Places in Keith County, Nebraska